Orval Eugene Faubus (January 7, 1910 – December 14, 1994) was an American politician who served as the 36th Governor of Arkansas from 1955 to 1967, as a member of the Democratic Party.

In 1957, he refused to comply with a unanimous decision of the U.S. Supreme Court in the 1954 case Brown v. Board of Education, and ordered the Arkansas National Guard to prevent black students from attending Little Rock Central High School. This event became known as the Little Rock Crisis.

Early life and career
Orval Eugene Faubus was born in the northwest corner of Arkansas near the village of Combs to John Samuel and Addie (née Joslen) Faubus. Although Sam Faubus was a socialist, and enrolled Orval at the socialist Commonwealth College, the latter went on to pursue a very different political path from that of his father.

Faubus's first political race was in 1936 when he contested a seat in the Arkansas House of Representatives, which he lost. He was urged to challenge the result but declined, which earned him the gratitude of the Democratic Party. As a result, he was elected circuit clerk and recorder of Madison County, a post he held for two terms.

His book, In This Faraway Land, documents the military period of his life. He was active in veterans' causes for the remainder of his life. When Faubus returned from the war, he cultivated ties with leaders of Arkansas' Democratic Party, particularly with progressive reform Governor Sid McMath, leader of the post-war "GI Revolt" against corruption, under whom he served as director of the state's highway commission. Meanwhile, conservative Francis Cherry defeated McMath's bid for a third term in the 1952 Democratic primary. Cherry became unpopular with voters, and Faubus challenged him in the 1954 primary.

1954 gubernatorial election
In the 1954 campaign, Faubus was compelled to defend his attendance at the defunct northwest Arkansas Commonwealth College in Mena, as well as his early political upbringing. Commonwealth College had been formed by leftist academic and social activists, some of whom later were revealed to have had close ties with the Communist Party USA. Most of those who attended and taught there were idealistic young people who sought an education or, in the case of the faculty, a job which came with room and board.

Democratic primary
During the runoff, Cherry and his surrogates accused Faubus of having attended a "communist" school and implied that his sympathies remained leftist. Faubus at first denied attending, and then admitted enrolling "for only a few weeks". Later, it was shown that he had remained at the school for more than a year, earned good grades, and was elected student body president. Faubus led a group of students who testified on behalf of the college's accreditation before the state legislature. Nevertheless, efforts to paint the candidate as a communist sympathizer backfired in a climate of growing resentment against such allegations. Faubus narrowly defeated Cherry to win the Democratic gubernatorial nomination.  Relations were cool between the two men for years, but when Cherry died in 1965, Faubus put politics aside and was magnanimous in praising his predecessor.

General election
In the 1954 general election campaign against Little Rock Mayor Pratt C. Remmel, Faubus secured the endorsement of the previous 1950 and 1952 Republican gubernatorial nominee, Jefferson W. Speck, a planter from Mississippi County in eastern Arkansas. Faubus defeated Remmel by a 63% to 37% percent margin. Remmel, a businessman and scion of a prominent Republican family, polled the strongest vote at the time for a GOP candidate since Reconstruction. Faubus rejected his father's radicalism for the more mainline New Deal, a pragmatic move. He was elected governor as a liberal Democrat. A moderate on racial issues, he adopted racial policies that were palatable to influential white voters in the Delta region as part of a strategy to effect key social reforms and economic growth in Arkansas.

Governor of Arkansas, 1955–1967

The 1954 election made Faubus sensitive to attacks from the political right. It has been suggested that this sensitivity contributed to his later stance against integration when he was challenged by segregationist elements within his own party. He was known as a particularly effective one-on-one campaigner and was said to have never turned away anyone who sought to shake his hand, no matter how much time it took.

Little Rock crisis

Faubus's name became internationally known during the Little Rock Crisis of 1957, when he used the Arkansas National Guard to stop African Americans from attending Little Rock Central High School as part of federally ordered racial desegregation.

Critics have long charged that Faubus's fight in Little Rock against the 1954 Brown v. Board of Education decision by the U.S. Supreme Court that separate schools were inherently unequal was politically motivated. The ensuing battle helped to shield him from the political fallout from a tax increase. Journalist Harry Ashmore (who won a Pulitzer Prize for his columns on the subject) portrayed the fight over Central High as a crisis manufactured by Faubus. Ashmore said that Faubus used the Guard to keep blacks out of Central High School because he was frustrated by the success his political opponents were having in using segregationist rhetoric to arouse white voters.

Faubus's decision led to a showdown with President Dwight D. Eisenhower and former Governor Sid McMath. On September 5, 1957, Eisenhower sent a telegram to Governor Orval E. Faubus in which he wrote "The only assurance I can give you is that the Federal Constitution will be upheld by me by every legal means at my command." This was a response to Faubus's concerns about being taken into custody and his telephones being wired. Eisenhower did say in his telegram that the Department of Justice was collecting facts as to why there was a failure to comply with the courts. This led to the September 14 conference where Faubus and Eisenhower discussed the Court order in Newport, Rhode Island. The quoted "friendly and constructive discussion" led to the Governor claiming his desire to comply with his duty to the Constitution, personal opinions aside. The Governor did express his hope that the Department of Justice would be patient. The Arkansas Governor did stay true to his word and on September 21, President Eisenhower released a statement which announced that the Governor had withdrawn his troops, the Little Rock School Board was carrying out desegregation plans, and local law was ready to keep order.

On September 23, however, Mayor Woodrow Wilson Mann sent a telegram to Dwight Eisenhower stating a mob had formed at Central High School in Little Rock. State Police made efforts to control the mob, but for the safety of the newly enrolled children, they were sent home. The Mayor stressed how this was a planned act and that the principal agitator, Jimmy Karam, was an associate of Governor Faubus. The Mayor further explained how there was no way the Governor could not have been aware of this planned attack. In October 1957, Eisenhower federalized the Arkansas National Guard and ordered them to return to their armories which effectively removed them from Faubus's control. Eisenhower then sent elements of the 101st Airborne Division to Arkansas to protect the black students and enforce the Federal court order. The Arkansas National Guard later took over protection duties from the 101st Airborne Division. In retaliation, Faubus shut down Little Rock high schools for the 1958–1959 school year. This is often referred to as "The Lost Year" in Little Rock.

In a 1985 interview with a Huntsville Arkansas student, Faubus stated that the Crisis was due to an "Usurpation of power" by the Federal Government. The State knew forced integration by the Federal Government was going to meet with unfavorable results from the Little Rock public. In his opinion, he was acting in his State's best interest at the time.

Though Faubus later lost general popularity as a result of his support for segregation, at the time he was included among the "Ten Men in the World Most Admired by Americans", according to Gallup's most admired man and woman poll for 1958. This dichotomy was later summed up as follows: Faubus was both the "best loved" and "most hated" of Arkansas politicians of the second half of the twentieth century.

The Little Rock Crisis inspired the song "Fables of Faubus" by jazz artist Charles Mingus.

Faubus-style politics

Faubus was elected governor to six two-year terms and hence served for twelve years. He maintained a defiant, populist image, while he shifted toward a less confrontational stance with the federal government, particularly during the administrations of Presidents John F. Kennedy and Lyndon B. Johnson, with each of whom he remained cordial, and both of whom carried Arkansas.

In the 1956 general election, Faubus, having already beaten Jim Johnson, overwhelmed GOP candidate Roy Mitchell, later the GOP state chairman from Hot Springs, 321,797 (80.7%) to 77,215 (19.4%). In 1958, he defeated Republican George W. Johnson of Greenwood in Sebastian County by drawing 82.5% of the votes.

In 1960, Faubus defeated Attorney General Bruce Bennett in the Democratic gubernatorial primary, then crushed the Republican choice, Henry M. Britt, an attorney from Hot Springs, to secure reelection. Faubus polled 292,064 votes (69.2%) to Britt's 129,921 (30.8%). In the presidential election contest, however, Democrat John F. Kennedy won Arkansas over the Republican Richard M. Nixon by less than expected. Britt was later a circuit judge in Garland County from 1967 to 1983.

In 1962, Faubus broke with the White Citizens' Councils and other groups, who preferred, but did not officially endorse, U.S. Representative Dale Alford in that year's gubernatorial primary. Faubus cast himself as a moderate, he completely ignored the race issue during the 1962 election campaign, and barely secured a majority over Alford, McMath, and three other candidates. He then handily defeated the Republican Willis Ricketts, a then 37-year-old pharmacist from Fayetteville in the general election.

While Faubus was still shunned by black leaders, he nevertheless won a large percent of the black vote. In 1964, when he defeated the Republican Winthrop Rockefeller by a 57–43 percent margin, Faubus won 81 percent of the black vote. He even collected a share of the base Republican vote from the conservative party members who had sided with former Republican state chairman William L. Spicer of Fort Smith, an intraparty rival of Rockefeller.

1960 presidential election
During the 1960 presidential election, at a secret meeting held in a rural lodge near Dayton, Ohio, the National States Rights Party (NSRP) nominated Orval Faubus for President and retired U.S. Navy Rear Admiral John G. Crommelin of Alabama for Vice President. Faubus, however, did not campaign on this ticket actively, and won only 0.07% of the vote (best in his native Arkansas: 6.76%), losing to the John F. Kennedy and Lyndon B. Johnson ticket.

Later life and death
Faubus chose not to run for re-election to a seventh term in what would likely have been a difficult race in 1966. Former gubernatorial candidate James D. Johnson, by then an elected Arkansas Supreme Court Justice, narrowly won the Democratic nomination over another justice, the moderate Frank Holt. Johnson was then defeated in the general election by Winthrop Rockefeller, who became the state's first GOP governor since Reconstruction. Years later, Johnson himself became a Republican and supported Governor Frank D. White, later a benefactor of Faubus.

In the 1968 United States presidential election, Faubus was among five people considered for the vice-presidential slot of third-party presidential candidate George Wallace. However, in light of the public perception of both as segregationists, Wallace selected retired General Curtis LeMay. During the 1969 season, Faubus was hired by new owner Jess Odom to be general manager of his Li'l Abner theme park in the Ozark Mountains, Dogpatch USA. According to newspaper articles, Faubus was said to have commented that managing the park was similar to running state government because some of the same tricks applied to both.

Faubus sought the governorship again in 1970, 1974, and 1986 but was defeated in the Democratic primaries by Dale Bumpers, David Pryor, and Bill Clinton, respectively, each of whom defeated Republican opponents. In the 1970 race, two other Democratic candidates in the running, Joe Purcell and Hayes McClerkin, failed to make the runoff, and Bumpers barely edged Purcell for the chance to face Faubus directly. In his last race, 1986, he polled 174,402 votes (33.5 percent) to Clinton's 315,397 (60.6 percent).

Faubus's decline occurred when the Democrats reformed their own party in response to public acceptance of the progressive policies followed by Rockefeller. Thus, a new generation of popular Democratic candidates easily contrasted themselves favorably in voters' minds with Faubus's old-style politics and a more conservative Republican Party which followed Rockefeller's tenure in the state. In 1976, a report surfaced that Arkansas Republican leaders had approached Faubus about running for governor that year against Pryor, but both Faubus and the GOP denied the claim. The GOP instead ran the 40-year-old Pine Bluff plumber Leon Griffith as its sacrificial lamb candidate against Pryor, who won the second of his two gubernatorial terms with more than 80 percent of the ballots.

In the 1988 Democratic primaries, Faubus endorsed civil rights leader Jesse Jackson's campaign.

Faubus, a life-long Southern Baptist, died of prostate cancer on December 14, 1994, and is interred at the Combs Cemetery in Combs, Arkansas.

Electoral history
1954 Democratic Primary for Governor
Francis Cherry (inc.) 47%
Orval Faubus 34%
Guy H. "Mutt" Jones 13%
Gus McMillan 6%

1954 Democratic Primary Runoff for Governor
Orval Faubus 51%
Francis Cherry 49%

1954 General Election for Governor
Orval Faubus (D) 62%
Pratt Remmel (R) 38%

1956 Democratic Primary for Governor
Orval Faubus (inc.) 58%
James D. Johnson 26%
Jim Snoddy 14%
Stewart K. Prosser 1%
Ben Pippin 1%

1956 General Election for Governor
Orval Faubus (D) 81%
Roy Mitchell (R) 19%

1958 Democratic Primary for Governor
Orval Faubus (inc.) 69%
Chris Finkbeiner 16%
Lee Ward 15%

1958 General Election for Governor
Orval Faubus (D) 82%
George W. Johnson (R) 18%

1960 Democratic Primary for Governor
Orval Faubus (inc.) 59%
Joe Hardin 16%
Bruce Bennett 14%
H.E. Williams 8%
Hal Millsap 2%

1960 General Election for Governor
Orval Faubus (D) 69%
Henry Britt (R) 31%

1962 Democratic Primary for Governor
Orval Faubus (inc.) 52%
Sid McMath 21%
Dale Alford 19%
Vernon H. Whitten 5%
Kenneth Coffelt 2%
David A. Cox 1%

1962 General Election for Governor
Orval Faubus (D) 73%
Willis "Bubs" Ricketts (R) 27%

1964 Democratic Primary for Governor
Orval Faubus (inc.) 66%
Odell Dorsey 19%
Joe Hubbard 10%
R.D. Burrow 4%

1964 General Election for Governor
Orval Faubus (D) 57%
Winthrop Rockefeller (R) 43%

1970 Democratic Primary for Governor
Orval Faubus 36%
Dale Bumpers 20%
Joe Purcell 19%
Hayes C. McClerkin 10%
Bill Wells 8%
Bob Compton 4%
J. M. Malone 2%
W.S. Cheek 1%

1970 Democratic Primary Runoff for Governor
Dale Bumpers 58%
Orval Faubus 42%

1974 Democratic Primary for Governor
David Pryor 51%
Orval Faubus 33%
Bob C. Riley 16%

1986 Democratic Primary for Governor
Bill Clinton (inc.) 61%
Orval Faubus 34%
W. Dean Goldsby 5%

See also
"Little Rock"

References

Further reading
Freyer, Tony A. "Politics and Law in the Little Rock Crisis, 1954–1957", Arkansas Historical Quarterly 2007 66(2): 145–166
Reed, Roy. "Orval E. Faubus: Out of Socialism into Realism", Arkansas Historical Quarterly 2007 66(2): 167–180.

External links

Orval Eugene Faubus Papers at University of Arkansas

Orval Faubus at Encyclopedia of Arkansas
Orval Faubus at National Governors Association
Oral History Interview with Orval Faubus from Oral Histories of the American South

20th-century American politicians
20th-century Baptists
20th-century far-right politicians in the United States
1910 births
1994 deaths
African-American history of Arkansas
American autobiographers
American male non-fiction writers
20th-century American memoirists
American segregationists
American white supremacists
Baptists from Arkansas
Burials in Arkansas
Candidates in the 1960 United States presidential election
Deaths from cancer in Arkansas
Deaths from prostate cancer
Democratic Party governors of Arkansas
History of the United States
Military personnel from Arkansas
National States' Rights Party politicians
People from Madison County, Arkansas
School segregation in the United States
Southern Baptists
United States Army officers
United States Army personnel of World War II
Writers from Arkansas